Principi d'Acaja is a Turin Metro station, located in Corso Francia near Via Principi d'Acaja. The station was opened on 4 February 2006 as part of the inaugural section of Turin Metro, between Fermi and XVIII Dicembre.

The platforms feature decals by Ugo Nespolo depicting various coat of arms used by the Savoia-Acaia family.

Nearby Attractions
 Casa della Vittoria
 Casa Fenoglio-Lafleur
 Villino Raby

Services
 Ticket vending machines
 Handicap accessibility
 Elevators
 Escalators
 Active CCTV surveillance

References

Turin Metro stations
Railway stations opened in 2006
2006 establishments in Italy
Railway stations in Italy opened in the 21st century